Siagoninae is a subfamily of ground beetles in the family Carabidae. There are at least 3 genera and more than 80 described species in Siagoninae.

Genera
These three genera belong to the subfamily Siagoninae:
 Enceladus Bonelli, 1813
 Luperca Laporte, 1840
 Siagona Latreille, 1804

References

 
Carabidae subfamilies